Cefazedone is a cephalosporin antibiotic.

References

External links
 Cefazedone Information

Cephalosporin antibiotics
Thiadiazoles
Organochlorides
4-Pyridones